St. Jude College Dasmariñas Cavite Inc. is a private non-sectarian institution that is a branch of Saint Jude College (Manila) in the city of Dasmariñas, Philippines. It offers Kindergarten to Grade 12, as well as a college department which offers bachelor of science and bachelor of arts degrees.

History 
Responding to the need to bring quality education to the rural areas, Saint Jude College established its first extension school at URC Avenue, Salitran IV, City of Dasmariñas Cavite. In October 23, 1999, Saint Jude College Dasmariñas Cavite Inc. inaugurated a two-storey building with 10 classrooms for pre-school, elementary and high school. It started with 35 students and later expanded to hundreds and then thousand to include enrollees in the tertiary level. With the continuing increase in enrollment, a five-storey building was constructed in addition to the two-storey building.

College department
St. Jude College Cavite has a college department offering tertiary academic programs such as Radiologic Technology, Nursing, Business Administration, Computer Science, Accountancy, Secondary Education Major in English, Filipino, Math, Science and Health, Elementary Education, Psychology, Tourism, and Hotel and Restaurant Management.

The college department has two deans: one for Nursing (as this program has the most students) and one for all other programs. Non-nursing programs are also headed by their respective program advisers.

Achievements
Last July 2015 examination for Radiologic Technology, St. Jude College Dasmariñas Cavite Inc. marks its history for getting the TOP spot in the entire Philippines. Patrick D. Agaloos made a legacy for them, he got the highest rank among thousands examiners of that one-day event.

May 2015 Board Examination for Nursing they got 100% passing rate for first timers. This proves that St. Jude College is one of the leading quality education provider in  Cavite and in the entire Philippines.

References

External links
St. Jude College, Cavite website

Schools in Dasmariñas
High schools in Cavite
Universities and colleges in Cavite